Mohamed Guezzaz (born October 1, 1962) is a retired association football referee from Morocco, best known for supervising match Spain–Slovenia during the 2002 FIFA World Cup.

References
 Profile at worldfootball.net

1962 births
Living people
Moroccan football referees
Place of birth missing (living people)
2002 FIFA World Cup referees